Spergularia purpurea, the purple sandspurry, is a species of annual herb in the family Caryophyllaceae (carpetweeds). They have a self-supporting growth form and simple, broad leaves. Individuals can grow to 9 cm.

Sources

References 

purpurea
Flora of Malta